Lawdar is a town and seat of Lawdar District in south-western Yemen. It is located in the Abyan Governorate.  It is served by Lawdar Airport.

History
In October 2010, riots took place in Lawdar. A military force from Hadramut had to be sent in to maintain order. Dozens have been killed within Lawdar District in conflicts between the jihadists and the army.

References

External links
Towns and villages in the Abyan Governorate

Populated places in Abyan Governorate
Villages in Yemen
Towns in Yemen